Witkoppen is a suburb of Johannesburg, South Africa. The main road is also known as Witkoppen Road.

References

Johannesburg Region A